Andrey Vorobiev (born 24 July 1985, Loshchinnyy, Engelssky District) is a Russian political figure and a deputy of the 8th State Duma.
 
From 2008 to 2017, he worked as the commercial director of several enterprises, such as Middle Volga Investment Group LLC, Agroalliance LLC, Middle Volga Service Company-Engineering LLC. In 2013, he was elected deputy of the Engels City Council of Deputies of Engels. In 2016, he was elected for the Assembly of Deputies of Engels. From 2017 to 2021, he was the deputy of the Saratov Oblast Duma of the 4th convocation. Since September 2021, he has served as deputy of the 8th State Duma.

References
 

 

1985 births
Living people
United Russia politicians
21st-century Russian politicians
Eighth convocation members of the State Duma (Russian Federation)